Belvarafenib (developed by Hanmi Pharmaceuticals and Genentech) is a small molecule RAF dimer (type II) inhibitor which shows anti-tumor clinical activity in cancer patients with BRAFV600E- and NRAS- mutations.

References 

Antineoplastic and immunomodulating drugs
Isoquinolines
Carboxamides
Chloroarenes
Fluoroarenes
Amines
Anilines
Pyrimidines
Thiophenes